Think Free is the ninth album by bassist Ben Allison. It was released on the Palmetto Records label in 2009.

Track list
All compositions by Ben Allison.

 Fred
 Platypus
 Broke
 Kramer vs. Kramer vs. Godzilla
 Sleeping Giant
 Peace Pipe
 vs. Godzilla
 Green Al

Personnel
 Ben Allison – Bass
 Jenny Scheinman – Violin
 Shane Endsley – Trumpet
 Steve Cardenas – Guitar
 Rudy Royston – Drums

References

External links
 BenAllison.com - Think Free

2009 albums
Ben Allison albums
Palmetto Records albums